Kenneth Michael Byrne (13 May 1913 – 14 May 1990) was a Singaporean politician, diplomat and lawyer who served as Minister for Health between 1961 and 1963, Minister for Labour between 1959 and 1961 and Minister for Law between 1959 and 1963.

Early life and education
Byrne was born in Singapore on 13 May 1913. His parents, John and Lizzy Byrne, were both born in Singapore and he was the second child.

He attended St Xavier's School in Penang where his father was working then and returned to Singapore with his family at the end of 1926. He continued his education at St. Joseph's Institution and Raffles Institution before enrolling into Raffles College in 1933 and graduating in 1936 with a Diploma in Arts with Class One honours.

Career

Colonial Civil Service
Byrne joined the service in 1938 and was assigned to the Colonial Administrative Service in 1946.

Byrne was appointed as the magistrate of the Fourth Police Court to replace R. E. Turnbull in 1939.

Byrne was called to the bar in London in 1950.

In 1953, Byrne was transferred to the Marine Department which was later brought under the Department of Commerce and Industry. 

He was later appointed as Assistant Secretary of Marine Department, and Principal Assistant Secretary and Deputy Secretary of Commerce and Industry Ministry.

Byrne was Permanent Secretary for the Ministry of Commerce and Industry in 1957 and left the government post in 1958 to join politics.

Political career
During the 1959 general election, Byrne won the election and was elected as the Member of Parliament for Crawford and was appointed as Minister for Labour and Minister for Law.

Byrne introduced the Industrial Relations Act and the Employment Act in Singapore, which ensured that workers in Singapore were not exploited by foreign investment companies in Singapore.
He also presented the Women's Charter to Parliament in 1961 to protect and advance the rights of women and girls in Singapore.

Byrne relinquished his portfolio as Minister for Labour but kept his portfolio as Minister for Law and was appointed as Minister for Health in 1961.

Post political career
Following Byrne's loss in the 1963 general election, he entered civil service and was appointed as Chairman of the Central Provident Fund and Chairman of the Singapore Tourist Promotion Board.

Byrne was appointed as Singapore's High Commissioner to New Zealand in 1966. In 1973, he was concurrently Singapore's High Commissioner to Bangladesh, Iran, Nepal and Sri Lanka.

He went on to become a lawyer, setting up a private practice in Singapore until his death in 1990.

Personal life
Byrne married Elaine Margaret Marcus on 5 August 1939.
They have two children, Walter James and Melanie Mary.

References

1913 births
1990 deaths
20th-century Singaporean lawyers
Members of the Parliament of Singapore
Members of the Cabinet of Singapore
Singaporean civil servants
Singaporean diplomats
Ministers for Health of Singapore
Ministers for Law of Singapore
Ministers for Labour of Singapore
Members of the Legislative Assembly of Singapore